McMath may refer to:

Alwyn McMath, cyclist
Bob McMath, historian
Francis Charles McMath (1867–1938), engineer and astronomer
Ginger Rogers (1911–1995), American actress
Jahi McMath (2000–2018), American citizen
Paula McMath, musician
Racey McMath (born 1999), American football player
Robert Raynolds McMath (1891–1962), solar astronomer
Sid McMath (1912–2003), American politician

See also

 1955 McMath
 McMath (crater)
 McMath Middle School
 McMath Secondary School
 McMath–Hulbert Observatory
 McMath–Pierce solar telescope